Bulbophyllum gyrochilum is a species of epiphytic orchid described by Gunnar Seidenfaden, in the genus Bulbophyllum.

References

The Bulbophyllum-Checklist
The Internet Orchid Species Photo Encyclopedia

gyrochilum